Cardano is a public blockchain platform. It is open-source and decentralized, with consensus achieved using proof of stake. It can facilitate peer-to-peer transactions with its internal cryptocurrency, ADA.

Cardano's development began in 2015, led by Ethereum co-founder Charles Hoskinson. The project is overseen and supervised by the Cardano Foundation based in Zug, Switzerland. When launched in 2017, it was the largest cryptocurrency to use a proof-of-stake blockchain, which is seen as a greener alternative to proof-of-work protocols.

History

After leaving Ethereum in 2014 Charles Hoskinson and Jeremy Wood set out their plans for Cardano in 2015. Hoskinson had left Ethereum after a dispute with another co-founder, Vitalik Buterin. Hoskinson wanted to accept venture capital and create a company, while Buterin wanted to keep it as a nonprofit organization. Woods and Hoskinson co-founded the business IOHK to develop blockchains for use by corporations, governments, and education institutions.

Cardano was initially released to the public in 2017.  That year, IOHK partnered with the University of Edinburgh to launch the Blockchain Technology Laboratory. The lab had six post-doctoral and professorial positions with up to 35 jobs created in total, and was led by Aggelos Kiayias, developer of the Ouroboros protocol.

Cardano reached a market cap of $77 billion in May 2021, which was the fourth highest for a cryptocurrency at that time. 

Advertising agency MBLM ranked Cardano 26th for brand intimacy out of 600 brands in August 2022, in between Ford and Nestlé and the highest rank for a cryptocurrency. Citing an MBLM partner, advertising industry magazine Ad Age said Cardano's high ranking "can likely be chalked up to the gambling element of crypto".

Design

Governance

Cardano is controlled by three entities:
 Cardano foundation aims to standardize and promote the ecosystem (based in Switzerland).
 IOHK: an engineering company responsible for building the Cardano blockchain.
 Emurgo: responsible for commercial applications.

As of 2021, Frederik Gregaard is known to be the CEO of the Cardano Foundation.

The platform is named after Italian mathematician Gerolamo Cardano, while the cryptocurrency itself is named after the English mathematician Ada Lovelace. The Ada sub-unit is the Lovelace; one Ada = 1,000,000 Lovelaces. Cardano differentiates itself from many other cryptocurrencies by focusing on scientific research and working together with universities.

Technical design
Atypically, Cardano does not have a white paper. Instead, it uses design principles intended to overcome issues faced by earlier cryptocurrencies such as scalability, interoperability, and regulatory compliance. Cardano claims that it overcomes problems found in other cryptocurrencies: mainly that Bitcoin is too slow and inflexible, and that Ethereum is not safe or scalable. Like Bitcoin, Cardano uses a UTXO ledger model, though it is an extended version (EUTXO) to facilitate smart contracts and scripting languages.

Cardano uses a proof-of-stake (PoS) protocol named Ouroboros; this is in contrast to Bitcoin and Ethereum, which use proof-of-work protocols (though the latter switched over in 2022). Proof-of-stake blockchains use far less energy than proof-of-work chains. This is achieved by eliminating the computing resources that a proof of work algorithm requires. In February 2021, Hoskinson estimated the Cardano network used 6 GWh annually, less than 0.01% of the 110.53 TWh used by the Bitcoin network as calculated by the University of Cambridge.

Within the Cardano platform, Ada exists on the settlement layer. This layer is similar to Bitcoin and keeps track of transactions. The second layer is the computation layer and is designed to be similar to Ethereum, enabling smart contracts and applications to run on the platform.

The cryptocurrency Ada (ADA) can be stored on Cardano's native digital wallet named "Daedalus". The wallet downloads a full copy of the entire Cardano blockchain transaction history. Users face the risk of losing access to funds if the wallet's seed phrase is lost or stolen. The review in Investopedia highlighted the wallet's security and noted the lack of: mobile support, support for other tokens, and "onramp" to purchase assets with money.

Development phases of Cardano, or "eras", are named after notable figures in poetry and computer science: Byron, Shelley, Goguen, Basho and Voltaire. The current era Basho focuses on scaling the blockchain. Voltaire, is intended to be the final era, and which is planned to add voting and treasury management functionality to the blockchain through previously introduced smart contract functionality. Once Voltaire is complete IOHK has said it plans to release the development of the network entirely to the community.

As with other proof-of-stake cryptocurrencies, Cardano offers "staking", which allows token holders to set-aside (delegate) tokens to potentially "validate" transactions on the same blockchain (see Figure 1). The quantity of tokens staked corresponds with the likelihood of being chosen to validate a transaction, and thus be rewarded by the algorithm with more of the same token. Cardano's Daedalus wallet allows for staking. For Cardano, users participate in "staking pools" with other token-holders.

Applications

Applications of the Cardano blockchain include:

 In 2018 IOHK signed a memorandum of understanding with the government of Ethiopia to consider the use of Cardano in its coffee supply chain. The partnership with the Ethiopian government also investigate other ways to deploy Cardano in the country.
 In 2019, the Ministry of Education in the country of Georgia signed a memorandum of understanding with the Free University of Tbilisi to use Cardano and Atala, IOHK's decentralized identity software, to build a credential verification system for Georgia.
 In 2019, New Balance announced a pilot program on the Cardano blockchain so buyers could track the authenticity of OMN1S Kawhi Leonard basketball shoes.
 In April 2021, IOHK and the Ethiopia Ministry of Education announced plans for an identity and record-keeping system on Cardano and Atala for the country's five million school pupils.
 In 2021 Hoskinson began working with electronic dance music DJ Paul Oakenfold to release an album, Zombie Lobster, on the Cardano blockchain.
 In 2021 IOHK and Dish Network announced a collaboration to investigate the use of distributed ledger technology.
 The Cardano blockchain is cited as helping citizens in Zanzibar, Ethiopia and Burundi get digital IDs. 
 World Mobile Token (WMT), a project built on Cardano, offers remote mobile network access in Africa with approximately 150 nodes in East Africa (2022). Mark Cuban is cited as being skeptical about the project and Cardano adoption.

Decentralized Finance

Cardano implemented decentralized finance (DeFi) services on September 12, 2021, including an upgrade to enable smart contracts and the ability to build decentralized applications (DApps). Also included is Plutus, a Turing-complete smart contract language written in Haskell, and a specialized smart contract language, Marlowe, designed for non-programmers in the financial sector. Cardano's smart contract languages allow developers to run end-to-end tests on their program without leaving the integrated development environment or deploying their code.

Legal status and regulation

In 2023, the SEC issued a complaint against the cryptocurrency exchange Kraken for offering unregistered securities (in violation of the Securities Act) and promising returns on investment for staking in proof-of-stake cryptocurrencies including Cardano. Without any admission of wrongdoing, Kraken agreed to pay a $30 million dollar fine and halt its staking program in response.

References

External links
 

Blockchains
Cross-platform software
Alternative currencies
Cryptocurrency projects
2017 establishments in Switzerland
Currencies introduced in 2017
Internet properties established in 2017